Sheikh Zuweid (also spelled Sheikh Zoweid, Shaykh Zuwayd, or Sheikh Zouède;   , , Greek: Bitulion) is a Bedouin town in the North Sinai Governorate of Egypt near the border with the Gaza Strip. It is situated between the cities of Arish and Rafah and is 334 kilometers (214 miles) northeast of Cairo. It has a population of around 60,000 as of 2015.

History
A remarkable mosaic from Late Antiquity (between the mid-fourth and mid-fifth centuries) was found in Sheikh Zuweid in 1913, known from the archaeological literature as the Sheikh Zouède mosaic (leaning on the French spelling: Cheikh Zouède). It is currently preserved in a museum in Ismailia. The 6th century Madaba Map shows a settlement called Betulion (Greek Β[ητ]υλιον) in this location, possibly the Bethulia where Judith beheaded Holofernes in biblical legend.

The town is named after Sheikh Zuweid, a commander of the Rashidun Islamic army who fought during the Muslim conquest of Egypt alongside Amr ibn al-'As. He died at the site of the present town in 640. 

During the 2011 Egyptian revolution, protests against the government of Hosni Mubarak were held in Sheikh Zuweid. On 27 January, one protester was killed by security forces attempting to disperse the demonstrations. On 14 May 2011, an unknown group bombed the Sufi shrine in Sheikh Zuweid. As many as 70 ISIS affiliated militants using mortars and car bombs attacked five Army checkpoints just north of the city on July 1, 2015. The attacks killed 30 Egyptian soldiers and were part of a larger group of coordinated attacks across the Sinai.

Climate
Köppen-Geiger climate classification system classifies its climate as hot desert (BWh), as the rest of Egypt, but because it is close to the sea, its climate is highly moderated by prevailing Mediterranean Sea winds, typical to the north coast of Egypt and the east Mediterranean coast.

See also

 List of cities and towns in Egypt
 North Sinai
 Sinai
 Northern coast of Egypt
 Gaza Strip

References

Populated places in North Sinai Governorate
Cities in Egypt